Born a King is a 2019 historical coming-of-age drama film directed by Agustí Villaronga. The film stars Abdullah Ali, Ed Skrein, Hermione Corfield, Laurence Fox, and James Fleet.

Plot
In 1919, following the collapse of the Ottoman Empire, 14-year-old Faisal is sent by his father, Emir Abdulaziz, on a high-stakes diplomatic mission to London to secure the formation of what was to become the Kingdom of Saudi Arabia. Young Faisal negotiates his country's and his family's future with seasoned politicians like Winston Churchill and Lord Curzon, and forms a friendship with Princess Mary.

Cast
 Abdullah Ali as Prince Faisal
 Yousef Alsaid as baby Faisal
 Ed Skrein as Philby
 Hermione Corfield as Princess Mary
 Laurence Fox as Lawrence of Arabia
 Rawkan Binbella as Emir Abdulaziz
 James Fleet as King George V
 Celyn Jones as Winston Churchill
 Rubén Ochandiano as Al Thunayyan
 Aidan McArdle as Humphrey Bowman
 Marina Gatell as Stella
 Kenneth Cranham as Lord Curzon
 Lewis Reeves as Prince of Wales

Production
It wrapped filming in late 2017. The production of the movie lasted nearly for four years. Filming locations include London, Riyadh and Diriyah. The film is Saudi actor Abdullah Ali's cinematic debut.

Release
It premiered at the Barcelona Sant Jordi International Film Festival (BCN FILM FEST) on 25 April 2019. On 26 September 2019 the movie was released in the United Arab Emirates, Oman, Kuwait, Bahrain and Saudi Arabia and earned a first-four-day $972,962.

Reception
Born a King is the recipient of the 2019 best film award from the Inward Eye Film Festival for independent cinema.

References

External links
 
 

2019 films
2019 drama films
2019 biographical drama films
2010s coming-of-age drama films
2010s historical drama films
2010s Arabic-language films
2010s English-language films
Biographical films about royalty
British historical drama films
Films set in Saudi Arabia
Films set in the United Kingdom
Films shot in Saudi Arabia
Films shot in the United Kingdom
2019 multilingual films
British multilingual films
2010s British films
Films directed by Agustí Villaronga